Royal Business Bank is a Chinese American bank based in Los Angeles, California. It is one of the biggest Chinese American banks in the country, and has branches in California, Nevada, and New York. It is a wholly-owned subsidiary of RBB Bancorp.

History
The Bank was founded by Louis Chang in November 2008 in Los Angeles, California. It started out with one location but since 2011, and has since has opened three new locations in San Gabriel, Torrance, and Rowland Heights. RBB has acquired First Asian Bank (Las Vegas) in 2011, Ventura County Business Bank, Oxnard, Los Angeles National Bank, Buena Park, and TomatoBank (Alhambra) for $83.2 million in 2015, spreading its coverage all over California and Las Vegas. In July 2017, RBB entered the Nasdaq and raised $86 million.

In September 2019, RBB acquired Pacific Global Bank in Chicago for $32.5 million. In May 2021, RBB raised $120 million to pursue its acquisitions spree and James Kao was elected new chairman of the board.

Overview
The company offers various financial services but primarily offers its products and services to individuals, small and middle-market businesses, municipalities, and other entities in the Chinese-American community. They have also branched out to include new customers that are not part of the Chinese-American community.

References

External links
 Official website

Companies listed on the Nasdaq
Banks established in 2008
Banks based in California
2008 establishments in California
Companies based in Los Angeles
Financial services companies of the United States
Chinese American banks
2017 initial public offerings
Chinese-American culture in California